Procar may refer to:
ADAC Procar Series, a German-based motor racing series for Touring Cars.
BMW M1 Procar Championship, a one-make motor racing series utilising the BMW M1 sports production car.
Procar Australia, a defunct Australian motor racing organisation body.